Hammel and Millgrove are extinct towns in western Warren County, Ohio, United States.  They are located along the Little Miami River, about 2 miles (3 km) south of Fort Ancient and 1 mile (1½ km) north of Roachester at the Strout Road crossing of the river.  Hammel lies on the eastern shore of the river, in southwestern Washington Township, and Millgrove lies on the western shore of the river, in northeastern Salem Township.

Hammel had its start in the 1840s when the railroad was extended to that point. The community was named after its founder. The GNIS considers Hammel to be a ghost town.

References

Unincorporated communities in Warren County, Ohio
Unincorporated communities in Ohio